Cleotilde Gonzalez is a Research Professor of Decision Sciences in the Social and Decision Sciences Department. She is also the founding director of the Dynamic decision-making laboratory at Carnegie Mellon University. Gonzalez is also affiliated with the Security and Privacy Institute (CyLab), the Center for Behavioral Decision Research (CBDR), the Human Computer Interaction Institute, the Center for Cognitive Brain Imaging, and the Center for Neural Basis of Cognition.

She is a lifetime Fellow at the Human Factors and Ergonomics Society and the Cognitive Science Society. She a member of the Governing Board of the Cognitive Science Society (2019-2025). Her research work focuses on how people and machines make dynamic decisions in real-time environments, when individuals have to adapt to external changes and make decisions using their experience. With Christian Lebiere and others, Gonzalez developed a theory of decision from experience in dynamic environments, called Instance-Based Learning Theory (IBLT). IBLT has been used as the basis to develop multiple computational models applied to diverse domains including: cybersecurity, human-machine teaming, and deception.

Cited works 

Gonzalez' most cited works

1. 

2. 

3.

References 

Living people
Carnegie Mellon University faculty
Universidad de las Américas Puebla alumni
Place of birth missing (living people)
Year of birth missing (living people)